Cryptogenic refers to something of obscure or unknown origin. It is commonly used to refer to:

Cryptogenic disease
Cryptogenic species

de:Kryptogen